The Jihlava is a river in the Czech Republic, a right tributary of the Svratka River. It originates in Jihlávka in the Křemešník Highlands at the elevation of 665 m and flows to the Nové Mlýny reservoirs, where it enters the Svratka River. It is 180.8 km long, and its basin area is 2,997 km2.

It flows through numerous towns and villages, including Jihlávka, Horní Ves, Horní Cerekev, Batelov, Dolní Cerekev, Kostelec, Dvorce, Rantířov, Jihlava, Malý Beranov, Luka nad Jihlavou, Bítovčice, Bransouze, Číchov, Přibyslavice, Třebíč, Vladislav, Kramolín, Mohelno, Biskoupky, Ivančice, Moravské Bránice, Nové Bránice, Dolní Kounice, Pravlov, Kupařovice, Medlov, Pohořelice, Přibice, Ivaň.

The Dalešice Hydro Power Plant, including the Dalešice and Mohelno Dams, are constructed on the river.

The longest tributaries of the river are the Oslava, Brtnice, Jihlávka and Rokytná.

References

Rivers of the Vysočina Region
Rivers of the South Moravian Region
Brno-Country District
Jihlava District
Třebíč District